Dead Island: Riptide is a 2013 action role-playing game developed by Techland and published by Deep Silver. Released in April 2013 for Microsoft Windows, PlayStation 3, and Xbox 360, Riptide serves as a continuation of the story to 2011's Dead Island, with the original four survivors, plus a new survivor, arriving on another island in the Banoi archipelago, which has also been overrun by zombies.

Dead Island: Riptide received a mixed reception from critics, who cited that the game did not fix any of its predecessor's problems, nor add anything new to the gameplay. A third title and first official sequel for the series, Dead Island 2, was revealed at E3 2014. It was originally set for a 2016 release; however, the game entered development hell after the project was moved over from Yager Development to Sumo Digital in 2016. The development of Dead Island 2 changed hands again in 2019, this time to an internal studio of Deep Silver, Dambuster Studios. The game is now scheduled for release on April 21, 2023. Along with the first game, Riptide was released for PlayStation 4, Xbox One, Windows, and SteamOS under the title Dead Island: Definitive Edition.

Plot

Riptide takes place immediately after the ending of Dead Island, with the four immune survivors: ex-American football player Logan Carter, rapper Sam B, undercover Chinese spy Xian Mei, and former Australian police officer Purna Jackson. Along with international terrorist Charon and native Yerema, asymptomatic patient zero of the Banoi outbreak, the survivors land on a military ship after escaping from the prison island. They are immediately taken into custody by the Australian Defence Force Colonel Sam Hardy and Frank Serpo, a civilian VIP. Yerema and Charon are taken away separately; Yerema bites one of the ADF soldiers as she is taken away. In the ship's brig, the remaining four meet another immune survivor, ADF Sergeant John Morgan, who claims he was part of a humanitarian effort on a nearby island until Serpo showed up and halted the mission.

Passing out from sedatives applied when they were examined, the player's character wakes up to find the ship overrun with zombies. Serpo flees via helicopter shortly before the out of control ship crashes into a rock. The immune regain consciousness on the shore of the island of Palanai and are found by Harlow, a WHO researcher, who tells them the zombie infection has spread there as well. After saving a holdout of survivors, they meet Colonel Hardy again; he tells the irate immune that Serpo's organization is interested in weaponizing the Kuru strain that caused the zombie outbreak and, as with Banoi, a nuclear strike against Palanai is planned to purge the infection and cover up the evidence.

At Hardy's suggestion, the immune and several other survivors decide to travel to the city of Henderson, in hopes the nearby army base can offer help. With no intact bridges or working boats, the survivors instead investigate a tunnel to reach a pier. A researcher based in the jungle, Dr. Kessler, tells the immune that he believes the zombie-creating virus mutation was created by exposure to chemical weapons. He warns the player these were stored in the tunnels, and that they could act as a mutagen to turn the virus in the immune's bodies into something they can no longer suppress.

As the immune clear the tunnels, Harlow exposes a secretly-infected survivor, Wayne, to the chemicals to see the results; Wayne turns into a giant monster, who the immune kill. Shortly afterwards, when attacked by a holdout of escaped prisoners who have seized the pier, the survivors go into an involuntary, prolonged fury. Kessler explains on the phone that this was probably the result of fumes from the chemical weapons acting as a mutagen, but tells them they should be fine if they avoid further exposure. The survivors subsequently reach Henderson, but as they take shelter in a movie theater, Harlow abandons them and the other survivors begin to turn against the immune.

The immune find the military base was overrun and contact Serpo; he tells them there is no nuclear strike planned, that Banoi is fine, that Hardy is not to be trusted, and agrees to send a helicopter to evacuate the survivors. Hardy freely admits he made up the nuclear strike to stir the survivors to action, and in turn insists Serpo is untrustworthy and only intends to evacuate the immune to continue his research. When Serpo's helicopter arrives, Hardy attempts to board it first to prove this. Serpo warns him to let the immune on first, then has him shot and killed. The survivors proceed to shoot the helicopter down.

Finding Serpo alive near the crash site, the immune are told that Harlow is not only immune, but also a terrorist looking to seize data and a vaccine from a quarantine zone. When the survivors storm the lab in the quarantine zone, they find Harlow; she tells them the outbreaks were started deliberately to test the virus, and there is no vaccine. Harlow, however, is in a violent rage, having had the mutagen tested on herself by the lab's staff. Convinced the immune are too dangerous to live, she takes the mutagen again and attacks them, prompting the other immune to inject themselves with it as well to kill her.

When the immune find a boat, they are greeted by Serpo again; he freely admits to orchestrating the outbreaks, but offers the immune medical help if they come with him. The immune instead leave him to the zombies and evacuate the island with the five other survivors in their party. Six days later, their boat washes up on another island, apparently abandoned. As the game ends, growling is heard from the inside of the boat, and the doorknob to the hold is turned open from the inside before the game abruptly ends. The fates of the immune and the other five survivors are left unclear.

Marketing and release
The game was first announced in June 2012, and in September 2012, the first teaser trailer was released. A music video for a song called "No Room in Hell" was released in November 2012 by rapper Josef "J7" Lord (who in the song is named Sam B as the main character from Dead Island), for promotion and featured Chamillionaire. A new trailer released in March 2013 titled "They Thought Wrong" showed new gameplay, characters, and enemies.

In Japan, the game was published and localized by Spike Chunsoft.

Mutilated torso promotion controversy

In January 2013, Deep Silver announced that Dead Island: Riptide would be available in a "Zombie Bait Edition", which would include a statuette of the bloodily dismembered torso of a bikini-clad woman. Marketing materials described it as the game's "take on an iconic Roman marble torso sculpture" and "a striking conversation piece". The American market version of the statuette has the "Stars and Stripes" patterned bikini, while the European counterpart has a Union Jack pattern.

The statuette caused an overwhelmingly negative reaction from the video game press and from activists. Journalists described the statuette as "gross", as something not even a sociopath would want, or as a "text book example of the most extreme ends of misogynist fantasy, a woman reduced to nothing but her tits, her wounds hideously depicted in gore, jutting bones, and of course barely a mark covering her globular breasts". Within hours of the announcement, Deep Silver's UK branch issued a statement that they "apologize for any offense caused" and that they "sincerely regret this choice", reiterating "how deeply sorry we are, and that we are committed to making sure this will never happen again". Deep Silver's US branch disavowed any part in the promotion. In April 2013, video game media reported that the "Zombie Bait Edition" did not seem to have been withdrawn from sale, and that Deep Silver's parent company had made an "extremely limited quantity" of the mutilated torso statuettes available to retailers in Europe and Australia.

Retail versions
Dead Island: Riptide has been released in a variety of different editions. Available versions include the standard version, limited edition, special edition, 'survivor' edition, 'Rigor Mortis Collector's' edition, and 'Zombie Bait' edition, with a variety of extra physical (notebooks, bobble figurines, and bottle openers) and in-game (character skins and weapons) content provided.

Reception

Dead Island: Riptide received mixed reviews, with most critics praising the gameplay and new setting, but criticizing the many unfixed issues found in the original, as well as the lack of new content. Aggregating review website Metacritic gave the PlayStation 3 version 62/100, the PC version 61/100, and the Xbox 360 version 57/100.

IGN Greg Miller stated that although he found it to be 'great gory fun', it still contained bugs and glitches that were found in the first game. He also stated that 'it was tempting to simply paste the original Dead Island review on the page and call it a day'. He praised the gameplay, co-op and the ability to import your save from the original, noting that the enemies you face are at scale with your level, so that the game gives you an appropriate challenge, but criticized the storyline and overall look of the game. He went on to say that it didn't do much to improve itself from its predecessor in terms of overall performance. However, he did state that the lackluster graphics and performance could be overlooked by how much fun it is to play. Miller gave the game a 7.2 out of 10.

GameSpot Mark Walton heavily criticized the game, saying: "Dead Island: Riptide might look like an idyllic zombie-fest, but it's little more than a frustrating mess of half-baked ideas and repetitive combat.". Walton gave the game a 4 out of 10.

References

2013 video games
Action role-playing video games
Advertising and marketing controversies
Deep Silver games
Horror video games
Infectious diseases in fiction
Multiplayer and single-player video games
Open-world video games
PlayStation 3 games
Post-apocalyptic video games
Role-playing video games
Survival video games
Techland games
Video game sequels
Video game expansion packs
Video games about cannibalism
Video games about zombies
Video games developed in Poland
Video games featuring female protagonists
Video games set in 2006
Video games set in Oceania
Video games set on fictional islands
Windows games
Xbox 360 games